Russell R. Wasendorf Sr. (born 1948) is the former chairman and chief executive officer of Peregrine Financial Group, also known as PFGBEST, a futures commission merchant (commonly known as a commodity broker) that filed for bankruptcy protection in Chicago in July 2012.

He was arrested in July 2012 following a suicide attempt. In September he pleaded guilty to embezzling $215.5 million from more than 13,000 customers over the course of 20 years. On January 31, 2013, he received a 50-year sentence for fraud, effectively a life sentence.

Career 
Wasendorf established Wasendorf & Son Inc. in 1980, renamed it Peregrine Financial Group (PFG) 10 years later and opened a Chicago office, according to the company website.

On July 9, 2012, the same day that the National Futures Association reported that PFG appeared to be missing at least $200 million in customer funds, Wasendorf attempted to commit suicide by asphyxiation outside company headquarters. Before doing so he left a suicide note  admitting to embezzling from the company for nearly two decades, according to the FBI affidavit. "I have committed fraud. For this I feel constant and intense guilt," he wrote in the note, according to the affidavit.

The bankruptcy filing took place after PFG was put under investigation for a shortfall of at least $200 million in customer funds. The firm was also accused by federal regulators of commingling customer and firm money.

Wasendorf was arrested and charged with making false statements to the Commodity Futures Trading Commission (CFTC). He admitted to stealing at least $100 million from his firm, according to an FBI affidavit that accompanied the criminal complaint unsealed on July 13, 2012, the date of his arrest. He pleaded guilty to all charges in July 2012.  In January 2013, federal judge Linda Reade sentenced him to 50 years of prison, all but assuring that he will die in custody.  She also ordered him to pay $215.5 million in restitution, though she noted that PFG's customers will probably never be made whole.

Wasendorf is the author or co-author of six books about trading and futures, has been an investor in the BESTDirect Online Trading platform, and in 2001 founded  (Stocks, Futures, Options), an industry magazine that ceased publication in 2012. Wasendorf has engaged in charity work and won a number of awards for contributions to the community.

References

External links
Last Days - The Fall of Peregrine, Wall Street Journal, video 12m19s, August 13, 2012
Crooked CEO gets 50 years, FBI

1948 births
Living people
American people convicted of fraud
Prisoners and detainees of the United States federal government